Banni Chow Home Delivery is an Indian Hindi-language television drama series that premiered on 30 May 2022 on StarPlus. It streams digitally on Disney+ Hotstar. Produced by Shashi Mittal and Sumeet Mittal under Shashi Sumeet Productions it stars Ulka Gupta and Pravisht Mishra. It is a remake of Star Jalsha's Bengali series Khukumoni Home Delivery.

Premise

Delivery-girl Banni is a feisty young woman who makes a living out of her catering and door-to-door food delivery business. She soon crosses paths with Yuvan, a mentally disabled man whom she eventually marries as a compromise. The show follows how Banni protects Yuvan from her in-laws who kept torturing him mentally and physically for years and also how she explores his musical talent and decides to make him a rockstar despite his mental illness.

Agastya, a rockstar, enters their lives initially as a storm but later ends up falling for Banni. Yuvan’s childhood friend, Tulika, too returns, who loves and is loved by Kabir (Yuvan’s split personality). 
 
With Yuvan suffering from split personality disorder, the three of them aim to cure him, holding back their emotions just for Yuvan and Banni’s happiness and union.

Cast

Main
 Ulka Gupta as Banni Singh Rathod: A home delivery agent; Suresh's niece; Vishnu's cousin; Yuvan's wife; Agastya's love-interest; Atharva's adoptive mother (2022–2023)
 Pravisht Mishra as Yuvan Singh Rathod: A singer and musician with special needs; Hemant and Vandana’s son; Manini's step-son; Palak and Myra's half-brother; Viraj's cousin; Banni's husband; Kabir(Split personality); Atharva's father (2022–2023)

Recurring
 Riya Sharma as Dr. Tulika Patil: Yuvan's childhood friend Bunty; Kabir (Yuvan)'s wife; Atharva's mother; Agastya’s friend; Vandana's music teacher's daughter. (2022)
 Arjit Taneja as Agastya Kapoor: Mentor and judge of Yuvan; Param's son; Banni's one-sided lover. (2022)
 Rajendra Chawla as Devraj Singh Rathod: Sulekha's brother; Hemant and Veer’s father; Yuvan, Palak, Myra and Viraj’s grandfather. (2022–2023)
 Parvati Sehgal as Manini Rathod: An entrepreneur; Prateek's sister; Hemant’s second wife; Palak and Myra's mother; Yuvan's step-mother. (2022)
 Vishal Puri as Hemant Singh Rathod: Devraj's elder son; Veer's brother; Alpana and Anchal's cousin; Vandana's widower; Manini’s husband; Yuvan, Palak and Myra's father (2022)
 Harsh Vashisht as Veer Singh Rathod: Devraj’s younger son; Hemant's brother; Alpana and Anchal's cousin; Vrinda's husband; Viraj's father (2022–2023)
 Preeti Arora Sharma as Vrinda Rathod: Veer's wife; Viraj’s mother; Yuvan, Palak and Myra's aunt. (2022–2023)
 Ayush Anand as Viraj Singh Rathod: Veer and Vrinda's son; Yuvan, Palak and Myra's cousin; Charmie's husband (2022-2023)
 Nikhat Khan Hegde as Sulekha: Devraj's sister; Alpana and Anchal's mother (2022–2023)
 Anushka Merchande as Palak Rathod: Manini and Hemant’s elder daughter; Myra's sister; Yuvan's half-sister; Viraj's cousin (2022)
 Palak Agarwal as Myra Rathod: Manini and Hemant’s younger daughter; Palak's sister; Yuvan's half-sister; Viraj's cousin (2022–2023)
 Payal Gupta as Charmie Rathod: Viraj’s wife (2022–2023)
 Manosi Sengupta as Anchal: Sulekha's younger daughter; Alpana's sister; Hemant and Veer's cousin (2022–2023)
 Pooja Singh as Alpana: Sulekha's elder daughter; Anchal's sister; Hemant and Veer's cousin (2022–2023)
 Alpesh Dixit as Suresh: Banni’s uncle; Vishnu's father; a drunkard and a gambler. (2022–2023)
 Neelam Gupta as Banni’s maternal aunt: Suresh's wife; Vishnu's mother (2022-2023)
 Ansh Pandey as Vishnu: Suresh's son; Banni's cousin. (2022–2023)
 Vaishnavi Mahant as Vandana Rathod: Hemant's first wife; Yuvan's mother (Dead) (2022)
 Manish Khanna as Param Kapoor - Agastya's father (2022)
 Neha Rana (2022)

Guest
Celesti Bairagey as Rajjo to promote Rajjo

Production

Casting
Ulka Gupta was cast as Banni Chow. This show also marks her return after a six year hiatus. Talking about her comeback on the small screen, Ulka says, "It was a completely natural process that I let myself flow with. After doing a couple of movies in Bollywood and down south, 'Banni Chow Home Delivery' was one of the right opportunities I decided to make my comeback with."

Ayush Anand was roped in for a pivotal role. Aamir Khan’s sister, Nikhat Khan also made her television debut through the same.

Arjit Taneja was roped in to play Rockstar Agastya Kapoor. Speaking on the same, he said, "I was looking for something that could challenge me as an actor and the Banni Chow offer came at the right time. I will have a grand entry as a rockstar and it will bring along a lot of mystery and suspense."

Riya Sharma was cast to play Dr. Tulika. On her entrance, she said, "I am very excited to be a part of the show as well as a bit nervous as Banni and Yuvan have great chemistry. And I am enjoying it as much as the audience does. I know people will go crazy seeing me between these two lovely love birds and wonder who is coming between them and why is she coming, but the story goes on for the audience."

Broadcast
The show suffered a change in time slot from 9pm to 6:30pm from 2 November 2022 onward. Speaking on this the producer, Sumeet Mittal, said, 
"Honestly, we are not disappointed. We agree that there were higher expectations in terms of ratings from a show that aired at 9pm. We are now working towards getting a good viewership in the new time slot."

Release
The first promo was unveiled in February 2022 starring Ulka Gupta as Banni.

Television special

Ravivaar With Star Parivaar (2022) 

The cast of Banni Chow Home Delivery participated in Ravivaar With Star Parivaar, a musical competition wherein eight StarPlus shows competed against each other to win the title of "Best Parivaar". Banni Chow Home Delivery emerged as the 5th runner-up of the show.

References

External links 
Banni Chow Home Delivery on Disney+ Hotstar

2022 Indian television series debuts
StarPlus original programming
Hindi-language television shows
Indian television soap operas
Indian drama television series
Indian romance television series